Johnny Ross (1931-2018) was an Australian rugby league footballer who played as a five-eighth for Parramatta in the 1950s.

Playing career
Ross was a Parramatta junior and made his first grade debut for the club in 1951.  Ross played a total of 33 first grade games for Parramatta at a difficult time in the club's history with the newly admitted side struggling due to a weak playing roster and lack of resources.  Ross claimed 2 wooden spoons as a player at the club.  Ross played over 100 games in total for Parramatta including reserve grade and third grade appearances.

Post playing
Ross coached teams in the local Wollongong district for a number of years before becoming a successful publican managing several pubs in New South Wales before retiring in 1997.  Ross then became the founding chairman of HOSTPLUS, the industry superannuation fund for a range of industries including hospitality.

References

1931 births
2018 deaths
Australian rugby league players
Parramatta Eels players
Publicans
Rugby league players from Parramatta
Rugby league five-eighths